Jinsha Site Museum is a station on Line 7 of the Chengdu Metro system in Chengdu, Sichuan, China. It was opened on 6 December 2017. The station serves the nearby Jinsha site and is located at the intersection of Qingyang Avenue and Jinsha Site Road.

Station layout

Gallery

References

Railway stations in Sichuan
Railway stations in China opened in 2017
Chengdu Metro stations